Jenny may refer to:
 Jenny (given name), a popular feminine name and list of real and fictional people
 Jenny (surname), a family name

Animals
 Jenny (donkey), a female donkey
 Jenny (gorilla), the oldest gorilla in captivity at the time of her death at age 55
 Jenny (orangutan), an orangutan in the London Zoo in the 1830s

Films
 Jenny (1936 film), a French film by Marcel Carné
 Jenny (1958 film), a Dutch film
 Jenny (1962 film), an Australian television film
 Jenny (1970 film), a film starring Alan Alda and Marlo Thomas

Music
 Jenny (EP), a 2003 EP by Stellastarr*

Songs
 "Jenny" (The Click Five song) (2007)
 "Jenny" (Nothing More song)
 "Jenny" (Studio Killers song) (2013)
 "867-5309/Jenny", a 1982 song by Tommy Tutone
 "Jenny", a 1968 song by John Mayall & the Bluesbreakers
 "Jenny", a 1973 song by Chicago from Chicago VI
 "Jenny", a 1995 song by Shaggy from Boombastic
 "Jenny", a 1997 song by Sleater-Kinney from Dig Me Out
 "Jenny", a 1997 song by Edyta Bartosiewicz from Dziecko
 "Jenny", a 2002 song by the Mountain Goats from All Hail West Texas
 "Jenny", a 2012 song by Walk the Moon from Walk the Moon
 "Jenny", a 2019 song by Kate Rusby from Philosophers, Poets & Kings
 "Jenny (Iowa Sunrise)", by Janis Ian from Night Rains

People and fictional characters
 Jenny (actor) (fl. 21st century), Telugu comedian and actor
 Jenny (singer) (fl. 2006), Spanish singer
 Jenny (Doctor Who), a character in Doctor Who

Places
 Jenny, Suriname, a town
 Jenny Estate, a mansion in Thalwil, Switzerland

Transportation
 Jenny (schooner), an alleged English ship in an unsubstantiated legend
 Jenny (1783 ship), an earlier schooner
 SS Jenny, a Panamanian steamship
 Curtiss JN-4 or Jenny, a biplane training aircraft
 Genoa (sail) or Jenny, a large form of the jib sail

Other uses
 Jenny (novel), a 1911 novel by Sigrid Undset
 Jenny (doll), a Japanese toy
 Jenny (TV series), a 1997 sitcom featuring Jenny McCarthy
 "Jenny", a 1978 poem by Patti Smith from Babel

See also
 Jennie (disambiguation)
 Jenei (disambiguation)
 Jeney (disambiguation)
 Jenny (brand), a fashion brand of Jenny Sacerdote
 "Jenny Jenny", a 1957 song by Little Richard from Here's Little Richard
 Spinning jenny, a device used in the textile industry